Broomhall is an English surname. Notable people with the surname include:

Alfred James Broomhall (1911-1994), British Protestant Christian medical missionary to China
Arthur Broomhall (1860–?), English footballer
Benjamin Broomhall (1829-1911), British advocate of foreign missions
Chummy Broomhall (born 1919), American cross-country skier
Erlon "Bucky" Broomhall (b. 1931), American skiing advocate
John Broomhall (21st century), English composer and audio producer
Keith Broomhall (b. 1951), English footballer
Marshall Broomhall (1866-1937), British Protestant Christian missionary to China
Sam Broomhall (b. 1976), New Zealand rugby union player
Susan Broomhall, Australian historian and academic

English-language surnames